South Lancs/Cheshire 5 was a regional English rugby union league for teams from the South Lancashire, Cheshire and Manchester region and was at the tenth tier of national competition.  Promoted teams moved up to South Lancs/Cheshire 4 and as the basement division in the local region there was no relegation.  Dwindling numbers of teams led to the division being cancelled at the end of the 2001-02 season and teams would either move up to South Lancs/Cheshire 4 or drop out of the league altogether.

Original teams

When this league was created in 2000 it contained the following teams:

Holmes Chapel - N/A (new to league)
Lucas Merseyside - relegated from South Lancs/Cheshire 4 (7th)
Manchester Wanderers - N/A (new to league)
Mossley Hill - relegated from South Lancs/Cheshire 4 (4th)
Oswestry - N/A (new to league)
Prescot - N/A (new to league)
Waterloo Vikings - N/A (new to league)

South Lancs/Cheshire 5 honours

South Lancs/Cheshire 5 was introduced as a tier 11 league at the start of the 2000-01 season.  Promotion was to South Lancs/Cheshire 4 while as the lowest level league in the North-West division there was no relegation.  After just two seasons the league was cancelled.

Number of league titles

Holmes Chapel (1)
Oswestry (1)

Notes

References

See also
 English Rugby Union Leagues
 English rugby union system
 Rugby union in England

10